Ger Owens (Gerald, Gerry, Ginger)born 13 July 1979 in Dublin is an Irish sailor. He competed at the 2004, 2008 and 2012 Summer Olympics in the 470 class.

References

External links
BBC Profile
RTE Profile

Irish male sailors (sport)
Living people
Olympic sailors of Ireland
Sailors at the 2004 Summer Olympics – 470
Sailors at the 2008 Summer Olympics – 470
Sailors at the 2012 Summer Olympics – 470
Sportspeople from Dublin (city)
1979 births